The 2010 Palm Hills International Tennis Challenger was a professional tennis tournament played on red clay courts. It was part of the 2010 ATP Challenger Tour. It took place in Cairo, Egypt between May 3 and May 8, 2010. The event was absent from 2003 to 2009.

Entrants

Seeds

 Rankings are as of April 26, 2010.

Other entrants
The following players received wildcards into the singles main draw:
  Mahmoud Ezz
  Karim Maamuon
  Sherif Sabry

The following players received entry from the qualifying draw:
  Nikola Ćirić
  Petru-Alexandru Luncanu
  Mohamed Safwat
  Fernando Vicente

Champions

Singles

 Ivo Minář def.  Simone Vagnozzi, 3–6, 6–2, 6–3

Doubles

 Martin Slanar /  Simone Vagnozzi def.  Andre Begemann /  Dustin Brown, 6–3, 6–4

References
ITF search 

Palm Hills International Tennis Challenger
Tennis tournaments in Egypt